Emerald Rapids is a codename for Intel's fifth generation Xeon server processors based on the Intel 7 node. Emerald Rapids CPUs are designed for data centers; the roughly contemporary Raptor Lake is intended for the wider public.  Nevine Nassif is a chief engineer for this generation.

Features

CPU 

 Up to 64 Raptor Cove CPU cores per package
 Trust Domain Extensions (TDX), a collection of technologies to help deploy hardware-isolated virtual machines (VMs) called trust domains (TDs)

I/O 
 DDR5 memory support up to DDR5-5600
 Up to 80 PCI Express 5.0 lanes

See also 
 Intel's process–architecture–optimization model
 Intel's tick–tock model
 List of Intel CPU microarchitectures

References 

Intel products
Intel microprocessors